The Okmulgee Public Library located at 218 S. Okmulgee Avenue in Okmulgee, Oklahoma is a functioning public library built in 1921, and listed on the National Register of Historic Places on July 28, 1983.

History
The library was built on donated land, and the $75,000 cost of construction was financed by a bond issue.  Building started in 1917, and was completed in 1921.  It was added to the National Register of Historic Places on July 28, 1983.  The structure has many Georgian Revival architectural characteristics such as the projecting pavilion with minor pediment, large compound arched windows, Corinthian-like pilasters marking corners and divisions between windows, modillioned cornice, and frieze with multiple moldings.  The Library was nominated based on both historical and architectural significance, because: (1) it was the first city library in Oklahoma to be constructed with funds derived from a municipal bond issue and (2) it is the best example of Georgian Revival design in Okmulgee County.

The Library is just outside the far southwest corner of the Okmulgee Downtown Historic District, itself NRHP-listed on December 17, 1992.  The building continues to function as a public library.

References

Buildings and structures completed in 1921
1921 establishments in Oklahoma
Georgian Revival architecture in the United States
National Register of Historic Places in Okmulgee County, Oklahoma